Kučerov is a municipality and village in Vyškov District in the South Moravian Region of the Czech Republic. It has about 500 inhabitants.

History
Until 1945, Kučerov belonged to the German-speaking enclave called Vyškov Language Island. The village was colonized by German settlers in the second half of the 13th century. The coexistence of Czechs and Germans was mostly peaceful, which changed only after 1935, when many Germans tended to Nazism. In 1945, the German population was expelled.

References

Villages in Vyškov District